The Snail and the Whale is a 2019 British-South African short computer-animated TV film, directed by Max Lang and Daniel Snaddon, and produced by Michael Rose and Martin Pope of Magic Light Pictures, in association with Triggerfish Animation Studios where the film was animated.

The short film is based on the 2003 picture book written by Julia Donaldson and illustrated by Axel Scheffler. The voices of the main characters include Dame Diana Rigg, Sally Hawkins and Rob Brydon. The special premiered on BBC One in the U.K. for Christmas 2019.

Plot 
The Snail and the Whale follows the amazing journey of a tiny snail who longs to see the world and hitches a ride on the tail of a friendly humpback whale. A joyous, empowering story about the natural wonders of the world and discovering that no matter how small you are, you can make a difference.

Voice cast 

 Diana Rigg as Narrator.
 Sally Hawkins as Snail.
 Rob Brydon as Humpback whale.
 Cariad Lloyd as Teacher.
 Arnold Brown and Emma Tate as the snail flock.
 Max Lang as the Fish in the Sea.
 William Barber, David Cummings, Charlotte-Davis Black, Emmy Dowers and Mia Wilks as the school children.

Broadcast
The special premiered on BBC One at 2:30 PM in the UK on Christmas Day 2019 and was watched by 4 million viewers.

Accolades

References

External links 
 
 
 Trailer

2019 television films
2019 animated films
2019 computer-animated films
2019 short films
South African animated films
British animated films
2019 films
Children's books adapted into films
Animated films based on novels
Annie Award winners
Films directed by Max Lang